Cabri may refer to:
Kabri, Israel, a Kibbutz in Northern Israel.
Tel Kabri, an archaeological site located on the grounds of the above kibbutz.
Cabri, Saskatchewan, Canada
Cabri Lake, Saskatchewan, Canada
Cabri Geometry, an interactive geometry program
Guimbal Cabri G2, a French light helicopter